Agathia conviridaria is a moth of the family Geometridae first described by Jacob Hübner in 1823. It is found in India and Sri Lanka.

References

Moths of Asia
Moths described in 1823